Bentham is a surname. Notable people with the surname include:

 Billy Bentham, English rugby league footballer of the 1920s
 Charles Bentham, 18th-century English shipwright in Dutch service
 Craig Bentham (born 1985), English association footballer
 Edward Bentham (1707–1776), English theologian
 Ethel Bentham (1861–1931), Irish doctor, politician and suffragette
 George Bentham (1800–1884), English botanist
 George Bentham (1843–1911), British operatic tenor
 George Jackson Bentham (1863–1929), British politician
 Howard Bentham (born 1965), British radio personality
 Isaac Bentham (1886–1917), British water polo player
 James Bentham (–1794), English clergyman and historian of Ely Cathedral
 Jeremy Bentham (1748–1832), English philosopher and jurist who developed utilitarianism
 John Bentham (born 1963), English association footballer
 Joseph Bentham (1593/94–1671), Church of England minister and writer on theology
 Lee Bentham (born 1970), Canadian former racing driver
 Mary Sophia Bentham (–1858), British botanist
 Nat Bentham (1900–1975), English rugby league footballer
 Percy George Bentham (1883–1936), English sculptor
 Phil Bentham (born 1971), English rugby league referee
 Rosie Bentham (born 2001), English actress
 Samuel Bentham (1757–1831), English mechanical engineer
 Stan Bentham (1915–2002), English association footballer
 Thomas Bentham (1513–1578), Bishop of Coventry
 Trevor Bentham (born 1943), former English stage manager and screenwriter

 Fictional characters
 Jeremy Bentham (Lost), another name for the character John Locke in Lost
 Karla Bentham, a character in the British television series Waterloo Road

See also
Betham (surname)